Jim Forbes (30 November 1908 – 23 July 1996) was an  Australian rules footballer who played with South Melbourne in the Victorian Football League (VFL).

Notes

References

External links 
 
 
 Jim Forbes, at The VFA Project.

1908 births
1996 deaths
Australian rules footballers from Victoria (Australia)
Australian Rules footballers: place kick exponents
Sydney Swans players